Joe Cocker's Greatest Hits is a greatest hits album by Joe Cocker. It was released in 1977.

Track listing
"With a Little Help from My Friends" (John Lennon, Paul McCartney) - 5:02
"Woman to Woman" (Joe Cocker, Chris Stainton) - 4:28
"The Jealous Kind" (Robert Guidry) - 3:48
"Black-Eyed Blues" (Joe Cocker, Chris Stainton) - 4:35
"I Think It's Going to Rain Today" (Randy Newman) - 3:58
"Cry Me a River" [Live] (Arthur Hamilton) - 4:04
"You Are So Beautiful" (Billy Preston, Bruce Fisher) - 2:40
"Feelin' Alright" (Dave Mason) - 4:11
"Delta Lady" (Leon Russell) - 2:49
"Darling Be Home Soon" (John Benson Sebastian Jr.) - 4:41
"High Time We Went" (Joe Cocker, Chris Stainton) - 4:27
"The Letter" [Live] (Wayne Carson Thompson) - 4:17

Chart

Weekly charts

Year-end charts

References

1977 compilation albums
A&M Records compilation albums
Joe Cocker compilation albums